The Dominican Republic competed at the 1976 Summer Olympics in Montreal, Quebec, Canada.

Results by event

Athletics
Men's 800 metres
 Francisco Solis
 Heat — 1:55.56 (→ did not advance)

Boxing
Men's Light Flyweight (– 48 kg)
 Eleoncio Mercedes 
 First Round — Lost to Aleksandr Tkachenko (URS), RSC-1

References
Official Olympic Reports

Nations at the 1976 Summer Olympics
1976
1976 in the Dominican Republic